Jean Sylvio Ouassiero (born 7 May 1994) is a professional footballer who plays as a right back for Fola Esch. Born in France, he represents the Madagascar national team.

International career
Ouassiero was born in the French overseas territory Réunion, and is of Malagasy descent. He was a youth international for France. He debuted for the Madagascar national team in a friendly 2-1 loss to Burkina Faso on 11 October 2020.

Personal life
Ouassiero's cousin, Samuel Souprayen, is also a professional footballer.

References

External links
 
 FFF Prfile
 Madagascar Football profile
 Anciens Centre AJA Profile
 

1994 births
Living people
Footballers from Réunion
People with acquired Malagasy citizenship
Malagasy footballers
Madagascar international footballers
French footballers
France youth international footballers
French sportspeople of Malagasy descent
Association football fullbacks
AJ Auxerre players
Standard Liège players
Championnat National 2 players
Championnat National 3 players
Challenger Pro League players
Luxembourg National Division players
Malagasy expatriate footballers
French expatriate footballers
Malagasy expatriate sportspeople in Belgium
Malagasy expatriate sportspeople in Luxembourg
French expatriates in Belgium
French expatriates in Luxembourg
Expatriate footballers in Belgium
Expatriate footballers in Luxembourg